European route E 25 (E 25) is a north–south European route, running from Hook of Holland in the Netherlands to Palermo in Italy. In the Netherlands, the highway runs from its northern terminus in Hook of Holland south–eastward through Rotterdam, Utrecht, 's-Hertogenbosch, Eindhoven and Maastricht to the Belgian border, near Eijsden. 

The highway is maintained by Rijkswaterstaat.

Route description

History

Exit list

See also

References

External links

N
025
Motorways in Gelderland
Motorways in Limburg (Netherlands)
Motorways in North Brabant
Motorways in South Holland
Motorways in Utrecht (province)
Transport in Eindhoven
Transport in 's-Hertogenbosch
Transport in Maastricht
Transport in Rotterdam
Transport in Utrecht (city)
South Limburg (Netherlands)